"Please, Mr. Sun" is a song written by Ray Getzov and Sid Frank and performed by Johnnie Ray featuring The Four Lads and the Jimmy Carroll Orchestra.  It reached number 6 on the U.S. pop chart in 1952.  It was featured on his 1955 album I Cry for You.

The single ranked number 30 on Billboard's Year-End top 30 singles of 1952.

Other charting versions
Perry Como released a version of the song as a single in 1952 which reached number 12 on the U.S. pop chart.
Tommy Edwards released a version of the song as a single in 1952 which reached number 18 on the U.S. R&B chart and number 22 on the U.S. pop chart.
Edwards released a new version of the song as a single in 1959 which reached number 11 on the U.S. pop chart.
The Vogues released a version of the song as a single in 1966 which reached number 48 on the U.S. pop chart.

Other versions
Les Baxter with His Chorus and Orchestra released a version of the song as the B-side to their 1952 single "Blue Tango".
Frankie Carle released a version of the song on his 1952 album, Top Pops.
Lynn Hope and His Orchestra released a version of the song as the B-side to their 1952 single "Hope, Skip, and Jump".
Bill Kenny released a version of the song as the B-side to his 1952 single "If I Forget You".
The Innocents released a version of the song as the B-side to their 1960 single "Gee Whiz".
Johnny Crawford released a version of the song on his 1962 album, The Captivating Johnny Crawford.
Paul Petersen released a version of the song as the B-side to his 1962 single "Lollipops and Roses".
Keely Smith released a version of the song on her 1962 album, Because You're Mine.
Joe Bataan released a version of the song on his 1972 album, Sweet Soul.
Doris Day released a version of the song on her 1995 compilation album, The Uncollected Doris Day with the Page Cavanaugh Trio, Vol. 2: Wonderful!
Bing Crosby released a version of the song on his 1998 album, Lonely Street. This was taken from a 1952 radio broadcast.

References

1951 songs
1951 singles
1952 singles
1959 singles
1966 singles
Johnnie Ray songs
The Four Lads songs
Perry Como songs
Tommy Edwards songs
The Vogues songs
Doris Day songs
Bing Crosby songs
Columbia Records singles
RCA Victor singles
MGM Records singles